Mazhar Khan may refer to:

Mazhar Khan (actor, born 1905) (1905–1950), Indian actor, producer and director
Mazhar Khan (actor, born 1955) (1955–1998), Indian actor, producer and director
Mazhar Khan (cricketer) (born 1964), Pakistani cricketer
Mazhar Khan, Pakistani diplomat implicated in the financing of the terrorist organization Jamaat-ul-Mujahideen Bangladesh in 2015

See also 
Mazhar Ali Khan (disambiguation)